Cornelius Bundrage (born April 25, 1973) is an American professional boxer. He is a two-time former world champion, having held the IBF junior middleweight title twice between 2010 and 2015. In 2006 he was a contestant on season two of the Contender reality TV show, where he reached the semi-finals.

Professional career
Starting out in boxing, Bundrage was a top prospect, remaining undefeated for ten years, which saw his record at (21-0, 13 KOs). As his alias K9 suggests, Bundrage had a reputation of being a dog inside the ring, damaging his opponents with fierce combinations. Cornelius' professional boxing record stands at (32-4, 19 KO's). Bundrage has shared the ring with 7 former world champions during his professional boxing career. Bundrage is currently a world champion boxing free-agent. His advisor is Bill Waller, and managed by Shawana Bundrage.

The Contender

In 2006, professional boxer Cornelius 'K9' Bundrage was a participant on ESPN's "The Contender" Season 2 boxing reality television show, with Hall of fame host Sugar Ray Leonard and Sylvester Stallone in Hollywood, California. During the show, Bundrage was viewed by millions of fans each week for fourteen weeks straight. He also was named "fan favorite" out of sixteen boxers from all over the United States. Bundrage was the last picked, winding up on the Blue Team. Wanting to avenge the slight, he volunteered to be the first member of his team to box in the tournament (quoting Matthew 20:16, "And the last shall be first") and found himself in a match against Michael Clark. In a tightly fought battle for five rounds, the two found themselves practically tied on points, Bundrage knocked Clark down with a massive right hand to the temple, which won him the fifth round on 2 of the 3 judge's scorecards and won a majority decision (2 judges said Bundrage won, 1 said it was a draw). Bundrage moved along in the tournament, while Clark was forced to hang up his gloves and go home.

In the quarterfinal round, Bundrage beat Walter Wright via unanimous decision.

Bundrage's strength failed him by losing too much weight leading up to the fight, when he faced Steve Forbes in the semifinals; Forbes won a unanimous decision over Bundrage, with the fans booing Bundrage because of intentional punches at the back of Forbes head.

Bundrage bounced back, then went on to win The Contender bronze medal fight against Norberto Bravo with a devastating TKO in the seventh round in very impressive fashion.

Career after The Contender
On the January 12, 2007, edition of ESPN's Friday Night Fights at the Emerald Queen Casino in Tacoma, Washington, Bundrage faced former top welterweight prospect Chris Smith. In an extremely close fight, Bundrage was able to survive a sixth round scare and would come back to hurt Smith with a left hook to the jaw in the final seconds of the last round. Bundrage defeated Smith via split decision.

On March 30, 2007, he fought in The Contender Challenge: UK vs. USA broadcast on ESPN. He won the fight with a 7th round knockout against Colin McNeil, assuring the American team a victory in The Contender Challenge: UK vs. USA. Bundrage showed superiority throughout the fight. The fight took place in Metro Radio Arena, Newcastle, England.

On July 11, 2007, "Wednesday Night Fights," K9 fought Joel Julio, a hard-hitting 22-year-old junior middleweight contender who at the time was rated top 3 in all major sanctioning bodies. The fight was held after the ESPY awards at Kodak Theatre. Bundrage took the opportunity on 3 weeks notice and lost a dangerous 37 pounds in a 3-week span. K9 gave all he had, which was not much and lasted 8 rounds off pure heart. At the 2:28 mark of the 8th, Julio caught Bundrage with a long clean right hand. Julio jumped on Bundrage, which caused the referee to call a halt to the fight.

On March 28, 2008, Bundrage would rebound with a career best win. Bundrage defeated former IBF Light Middleweight Champion Kassim Ouma by unanimous decision in Salamanca, NY. Bundrage survived an early cut to win by scores of 96-93, 96-93 and 95-94.

On November 13, 2008, Bundrage would face the respected journeyman fighter Grady Brewer. Bundrage lost the bout via controversial split decision that not only did many think he deserved, but led on punch-stats via a margin that was unexpected.

Then just a month later on December 13, 2008, Bundrage flew thousands of miles to Germany on 2 weeks notice to later upset previously unbeaten prospect European Champion Zaurbek Baysangurov via 5th round KO in an IBF eliminator for the #2 mandatory spot.

On June 27, 2009, Bundrage then fought in another IBF Title Elminiator against Yuri Foreman, which ended in a 'No Decision'. Bundrage accidentally headbutted Foreman in the third round and the ring physician ended the fight.

IBF junior middleweight champion
After four separate setback losses, two IBF eliminators and a no contest, Cornelius Bundrage finally got his questionable title fight with former Undisputed Welterweight Champion and then current IBF Light Middleweight Champion Cory Spinks on August 7, 2010 at the Scottrade Center, Saint Louis, Missouri, United States. Cornelius traveled to his opponent's home town and scored an impressive 5th round knockout over Spinks. Besides capturing his dream of becoming a world champion, Bundrage also brought a major championship back to his hometown of Detroit, Michigan. There hadn't been a Detroit world champion in 26 years since Thomas Hearns. Bundrage was able to pressure Spinks throughout the fight cutting off the ring, landing good shots and not letting Spinks get into his rhythm of jab and move, Spinks was able to perry the jab of Bundrage occasionally but couldn't capitalize. Midway through the fifth a perfect 1-2 combo landed on the chin of Spinks backing him up to the ropes, Bundrage followed up with two straight rights to the head that knocked Spinks down and into a daze, Spinks got to his feet but after taking too many good shots and with so much time left in the round, the referee Mark Nelson waved of the fight at 1:25 of the round, declaring Bundrage the new IBF Light Middleweight Champion.

First title defense
He made the first defense of his IBF title in a rematch against Sechew "Iron Horse" Powell on June 25, 2011 in Saint Charles, Missouri. Powell stopped Bundrage 5 years earlier in a wild rare double knockdown which ended in one round. In the rematch, K9 made a statement by winning a 12 round onesided victory, which avenged his defeat, winning by unanimous decision over Powell. The scores read 119-109, 115-113 and 117-111.

Rematch with Spinks
On June 30, 2012, K9 rematched Cory Spinks to defend his title for the second time in San Jose California on SHOBOX: the new generation. After knocking Spinks down in round 1, the fight began to even up until K9 dropped Spinks three times in the 7th round en route to a TKO victory. He then expressed his interest and desire to face fellow world champion, WBC Light Middleweight Champion Saul Alvarez.

Losing the title
In his third defense of the IBF title, Bundrage would lose the title to Ishe Smith via majority decision on February 23, 2013. He was docked a point in the second round for hitting Smith while Smith was on the canvas after a push/slip between the two fighters. The scores read 111-116, 114-114 and 111-116.

Return to title contention
Bundrage got back into the winning column, defeating Miami's own Joey Hernandez 23-1 (KO 13), by unanimous decision for the IBF Eliminator #1 position on January 24, 2014 in Indio California at the Fantasy Springs Resort Casino. Scores read 118-110 by all three judges. With the victory Bundrage landed himself another crack at the belt he lost just last year.

Second IBF junior middleweight title
On October 11, 2014, Cornelius Bundrage would face off against IBF Light Middleweight champion Carlos Molina.  Despite tiring early, Bundrage dominated Molina, dropping him twice and hurtIng him repeatedly throughout the match.  Bundrage would win the title via unanimous decision.

Professional boxing record

References

External links

African-American boxers
1973 births
Living people
The Contender (TV series) participants
American male boxers
Light-middleweight boxers
World light-middleweight boxing champions
International Boxing Federation champions